Ghulam Khan is a town in North Waziristan, Pakistan.

Ghulam Khan may also refer to:

Ghulam Abid Khan (born 1972), Pakistani politician
Ghulam Ali Khan (1902–1968), Indian painter
Ghulam Dastgir Khan, Pakistani politician
Ghulam Faruque Khan (1899–1992), Pakistani politician and industrialist
Ghulam Ghaus Khan (died 2005), Indian freedom fighter
Ghulam Ishaq Khan (1915–2006), seventh President of Pakistan
Ghulam Jilani Khan (1925–1999), former Governor of Punjab Province and Defence Secretary of Pakistan
Ghulam Mohammad Khan (born 1923), Indian politician, social worker and industrialist
Ghulam Mohammed Khan, Indian equestrian
Ghulam Mohiuddin Khan (died 1969), sixth prince of Arcot, India
Ghulam Muhammad Khan (1763–1828), Nawab of Rampur
Ghulam Murtaza Khan (1760–1840), Indian painter
Ghulam Mustafa Khan (1912–2005), Pakistani linguist, author, scholar, educationist and spiritual leader
Ghulam Mustafa Khan (singer) (born 1931), Indian Hindustani classical musician
Ghulam Qadir Khan (1920–1988), last ruler of the princely state of Las Bela, Pakistan
Ghulam Sadiq Khan (1939–2016), Indian classical music singer
Ghulam Sarwar Khan (born 1955), Pakistani politician
Guz Khan (born Ghulam Khan, 1986) or Guzzy Bear, English comedian and actor